Barlborough Hall School became an independent Catholic day school, in the Jesuit tradition, around 1939. The school is now the Preparatory school for Mount St Mary's College at Spinkhill, 2.2 miles down the road. The present head teacher is Mrs Karen Keeton.

History
The school is based at Barlborough Hall, a Grade I listed 16th-century country house in Barlborough, Chesterfield, Derbyshire, England. Originally built by Sir Francis Rodes (see Rodes Baronets) circa 1583–84, as the family seat, the hall’s Elizabethan design is attributed to Robert Smythson, one of a noted family of architects.

See also
Grade I listed buildings in Derbyshire
Listed buildings in Barlborough
 List of Jesuit sites in the United Kingdom
 List of Jesuit schools

Exterior

References

Further reading
 Peter McArdle, The Story of Barlborough Hall: With a Short Account of Its Parent College Mount St Mary's College, Spinkhill, 1979.

External links

Barlborough Hall site
Doomsday Book on Derbyshire
Photographs of Barlborough Hall

Houses completed in 1584
Roman Catholic private schools in the Diocese of Hallam
Catholic boarding schools in England
Jesuit secondary schools in England
Country houses in Derbyshire
Grade I listed buildings in Derbyshire
Educational institutions established in 1840
Preparatory schools in Derbyshire